Hamzeh Zarini (born October 18, 1985 in Eslamshahr) is a volleyball player from Iran, who plays as an outside spiker for the national team and Haraz Amol club. He competed at the Rio 2016 Summer Olympics. Zarini two named Most Valuable Player in Asian Club Championship.
Zarini in 2005 was invited to Iran national team. He won two gold and a silver team medal at Asian Championship.

Honours

National team
Asian Championship
Gold  medal (2): 2011, 2013
Silver medal (2): 2009, 2015
Asian Games
Silver medal (1): 2010
Asian Cup
Gold medal (2): 2008, 2010
West Asian Games
Silver medal (1): 2005
Asian U20 Championship
Silver medal (1): 2004

Club
Asian Championship
Gold medal (4): 2011 (Paykan), 2013 (Kalleh), 2018 (Khatam),2022 (Paykan)

Individual
MVP: 2008 AVC Cup
Best Server: 2010 Asian Games
Best Server: 2011 Asian Club Championship
MVP: 2011 Asian Club Championship
MVP: 2013 Asian Club Championship
Best Outside Spiker: 2015 Asian Volleyball Championship
MVP: 2018 Asian Club Championship

External links
 FIVB biography

1985 births
Living people
Iranian men's volleyball players
Asian Games silver medalists for Iran
Asian Games medalists in volleyball
Volleyball players at the 2010 Asian Games
Olympic volleyball players of Iran
Volleyball players at the 2016 Summer Olympics
Medalists at the 2010 Asian Games
Outside hitters
People from Tehran Province